Cyrniau Nod is a mountain summit in north east Wales. It is a former Marilyn, the Marilyn summit now being the nearby Foel Cedig. Its summit has the Snowdonia National Park boundary running through it. A number of rivers and streams rise from near the mountain including Afon Tanat, Afon Cedig and Nant Ystrad-y-Groes.

The views from the summit are extensive, if unremarkable due to the featureless, flat moorland surroundings.  The summit is marked by a small cairn surrounded by peat bog.

Walking on Cyrniau Nod and its tops is made easier by a track that passes close to every top except Cefn Gwyntog.  Otherwise, the walking would be tough indeed, requiring tiresome bog crossing for miles.

References

Llanwddyn
Mountains and hills of Powys
Mountains and hills of Snowdonia